Qawra Tower, also known as Qawra Point Tower or Fra Ben Tower, is a small watchtower in Qawra, limits of St. Paul's Bay, Malta. It was completed in 1638 as the fourth of the Lascaris towers. An artillery battery was built around the tower in 1715. Today, the tower and battery are a restaurant.

History
Qawra Tower was built in 1638 near the tip of Qawra Point, commanding the entrance to St. Paul's Bay to the west and Salina Bay to the east. It was built on or near the site of a medieval watch post. Since 1659, it has Għallis Tower in its line of sight. This linked Qawra Tower with the De Redin towers that allowed communication from Gozo to Valletta.

The tower's design is similar to the other Lascaris towers, with two floors each having a single room. Access to the upper floor was originally by a wooden ladder or scala di corda.

In 1715, a semi-circular gun battery was built around the seaward side of the tower. The battery had a low parapet, with guns being mounted en barbette. There were two blockhouses, which were linked by a V-shaped redan containing the main gate. Both the blockhouses and the redan were pierced with musketry loopholes.

An entrenchment wall was built close to the tower and battery in the 1760s, and parts of it can still be seen.

The tower was included on the Antiquities List of 1925.

Before World War II, the battery was fitted with two concrete gun emplacements. A pillbox was also built nearby.

Present day

Today, the tower is a restaurant, while the heavily altered battery serves as a swimming pool. The tower is slightly dilapidated, having been plastered with cement at some time, which is now flaking away, and has had water tanks and rough additional brickwork added to its roof.

Further reading
The Fougasses of Malta / M.B.H. Ritchie. AM. 6(1927)5(Marzo.195-203)

References

External links

National Inventory of the Cultural Property of the Maltese Islands

Lascaris towers
Batteries in Malta
Towers completed in 1638
Military installations established in 1715
Restaurants in Malta
National Inventory of the Cultural Property of the Maltese Islands
1638 establishments in Malta
Buildings and structures in St. Paul's Bay